The Fifth Petal: a novel is a 2017 novel by Brunonia Barry.  It is the third novel of Barry's set in Salem, Massachusetts and is about the investigation of the murder of a teenager that has eerie similarities to a series of murders that occurred twenty years previously.

Reception
Library Journal, in a review of The Fifth Petal, wrote "While a few quibbling questions may bedevil fans of Barry's The Lace Reader, the many suspenseful, intriguing events presented in this sort-of-sequel are sure to haunt them." and concluded "Banshees, lost memories, and secret pasts each play a significant role in this novel; enthusiasts of the author's earlier work and readers interested in the history of witchcraft and the occult will enjoy this return visit to Salem. " 

The New York Journal of Books found "There’s more than a murder mystery in The Fifth Petal. It’s also a history lesson, as well as a moral one ..  a story that should give us much thought while it entertains." 

The Fifth Petal has also been reviewed by Booklist (starred review), Publishers Weekly, Kirkus Reviews,

References

2017 American novels
Novels set in Massachusetts
Crown Publishing Group books
Salem, Massachusetts